The Pilocarpaceae are a family of crustose lichens in the order Lecanorales. The species of this family have a cosmopolitan distribution and have been found in a variety of climatic regions. Pilocarpaceae was circumscribed by Alexander Zahlbruckner in Adolf Engler's influential 1905 work Die Natürlichen Pflanzenfamilien.

In 2004, the family Micareaceae included the genera; Helocarpon, Micarea, Psilolechia, Roccellinastrum, and Scutula. Then in 2005, molecular phylogeny based on mitochondrial rDNA sequences showed that the genus Helocarpon was not related to the Micareaceae family and the rest of the genus were related to the Pilocarpaceae family and other genera.

Description
Pilocarpaceae species are crustose and have ascomata in the form of an brightly-coloured apothecium with a poorly-developed margin comprising loosely-intertwined hyphae. The ascospores are hyaline and often elongated with one or more septa.

Genera
Pilocarpaceae contains 32 genera and an estimated 445 species. The following list shows the genera, authority, year of publication, and number of species as of 2020 (unless a newer source is cited).

Aquacidia  – 3 spp.
Badimiella  – 1 sp.
Baflavia  – 1 sp.
Bapalmuia  – 22 spp.
Barubria  – 2 spp.
Brasilicia  – 6 spp.
Bryogomphus  – 1 sp.
Byssolecania  – 7 spp.
Byssoloma  – 60 spp.
Calopadia  – 27 spp.
Calopadiopsis  – 2 spp.
Eugeniella  – 11 spp.
Fellhanera  – about 100 spp.
Fellhaneropsis  – 9 spp.
Kantvilasia  – 1 sp.
Lasioloma  – 9 spp.
Leimonis  – 2 spp.
Loflammia  – 5 spp.
Loflammiopsis  – 1 sp.
Logilvia  – 1 sp.
Micarea  – 126 spp.
Podotara  – 1 sp.
Pseudocalopadia  – 1 sp.
Roccellinastrum  – 7 spp.
Schadonia  – 4 spp.
Septotrapelia  – 4 spp.
Sporopodiopsis  – 2 spp.
Sporopodium  – 24 spp.
Szczawinskia  – 5 spp.
Tapellaria  – 23 spp.
Tapellariopsis  – 1 sp.
Uluguria  - sp.

References

 
Lichen families
Lecanoromycetes families
Taxa named by Alexander Zahlbruckner
Taxa described in 1905